Jason Cram (born 21 July 1982) is an Australian freestyle swimmer.

Career
Cram first competed for Australia at the 2002 Commonwealth Games in Manchester where he finished 6th in the 200 metre freestyle in 1:50.30 and with Grant Hackett, Leon Dunne and Ian Thorpe won gold in the 4 × 200 metre freestyle relay in new Games record time of 7:11.69.

At the 2002 Pan Pacific Championships in Yokohama, Japan, Cram finished 12th in the 200 metre freestyle in 1:50.93, equal 24th in the 100 metre freestyle in 51.38 and with Hackett, Thorpe and Craig Stevens won gold in the 4 × 200 metre freestyle relay in 7:09.00.

At the 2003 Duel in the Pool between United States and Australia in Indianapolis, Cram finished 5th in the 100 metre freestyle in 50.29 and with Casey Flouch, Antony Matkovich and Adam Pine finished behind the United States in the 4 × 100 metre freestyle relay in 3:18.62.

At the 2003 World Championships in Barcelona, Cram with Matkovich, Stevens and Nicholas Sprenger finished first in the heats of the 4 × 200 metre freestyle relay in 7:17.68 with Cram swimming the third leg in 1:49.03. In the final, Cram and Matkovich were replace with Hackett and Thorpe who won gold in 7:08.58.

See also
 List of Commonwealth Games medallists in swimming (men)

References

1982 births
Living people
Australian male freestyle swimmers
Commonwealth Games gold medallists for Australia
Swimmers at the 2002 Commonwealth Games
Commonwealth Games medallists in swimming
Place of birth missing (living people)
Medallists at the 2002 Commonwealth Games